Addictions: Volume 2 is the second compilation from Robert Palmer, released in 1992. The album contained noted songs that Robert Palmer had from his Island Records albums Riptide, Sneakin' Sally Through the Alley, Pressure Drop, Double Fun, Secrets, Clues and Pride. This compilation has most of its songs being either remixed, remade, revoiced, or with early fades, with the exception of songs 10 and 14.

Critical reception

Upon its release, David Quantick of NME felt the compilation would not repeat the success of its 1989 predecessor Addictions: Volume 1 as although "it too demonstrates Palmer's eclecticism, [it] is less interesting". He described it as a "slightly inessential album" with only "two top songs": the "charming smoky ballad" "She Makes My Day" and "I Dream of Wires", the latter of which Quantick considered "so odd that it makes 'Low' sound like Sonia". Stephen Thomas Erlewine was noted that "all [the] tracks are quite good" and the album overall "sound[s] great", but was disapproving of the fact that many of the tracks presented "ha[ve] been remixed, remade, or [feature] new vocal tracks", resulting in it failing to be an "accurate retrospective".

Track listing
"Remember to Remember" (Remake)
"Sneakin' Sally Thru the Alley" (Remixed)
"Maybe It's You" (Remixed)
"You Are in My System" (Revoiced)
"I Didn't Mean to Turn You On" (Early Fade)
"Can We Still Be Friends" (Remixed)
"Man Smart, Woman Smarter" (Remixed)
"Too Good to Be True" (Remixed)
"Every Kinda People" (Remixed)
"She Makes My Day" (Original)
"Best of Both Worlds" (Remixed)
"Give Me an Inch" (Remixed)
"You're Gonna Get What's Coming" (Remixed)
"I Dream of Wires" (Original)
"The Silver Gun" (Early Fade)

Charts

References

1992 greatest hits albums
Robert Palmer (singer) compilation albums
Island Records compilation albums